Paolo Dosi (born 28 March 1954) is an Italian politician who served as Mayor of Piacenza from 2012 to 2017.

Biography 
Member of the Democratic Party, Paolo Dosi was Mayor of Piacenza from 2012 to 2017. He became the candidate of the center-left coalition (led by PD) because he won the 2011 primary election: Dosi was elected mayor in May 2012. After only a single five-year term, in December 2016 Dosi (eligible for a second and final term) decided to not run. He left office in June 2017.

Personal life
He was born in Piacenza, Italy. Dosi is married with Stefania. The couple has two child.

References 

|-

Living people
1954 births
People from Piacenza
Democratic Party (Italy) politicians
21st-century Italian politicians
Mayors of places in Emilia-Romagna